Forum shopping is a colloquial term for the practice of litigants having their legal case heard in the court thought most likely to provide a favorable judgment. Some jurisdictions have, for example, become known as "plaintiff-friendly" and so have attracted litigation even when there is little or no connection between the legal issues and the jurisdiction in which they are to be litigated.

Examples include the attraction of foreign litigants to the United States due to its expansive acceptance of personal jurisdiction and favorable litigation climate, and the United Kingdom for its stricter defamation laws and generous divorce settlements.

The term has become adopted in a wider context for the activity of repeatedly seeking a venue or willing listener for a concern, complaint or action, until one is found.

Related notions 
When a case is filed before a court, the court decides whether it has personal and subject matter jurisdiction, and if so, whether it is the most appropriate forum or venue. Under the doctrine of forum non conveniens, Latin for "inappropriate forum", a judge has a discretion to transfer a case if the court selected is not the most convenient one. If the courts in two states would accept civil jurisdiction, the plaintiff must be able to show that justice requires the trial to take place in the forum suggested by the plaintiff.

The plaintiff might have selected one forum on the following grounds:
The forum is not convenient to the defendant or his witnesses. There may be problems of expense of travel, health, or visa or entry permit.
The court, the judge, or the law is most likely to favour the plaintiff's case.

The defendant may take the following actions to seek a change of venue:
The defendant may petition the forum court that it should reject the jurisdiction and petition to transfer the case to an allegedly more convenient forum; or
If a case has been filed in another jurisdiction, the defendant may seek injunctive relief against the plaintiff in a second state, requiring that the plaintiff discontinue the action in the first forum and instead submit the case for hearing in this allegedly more convenient forum.

In both instances, the first step is to determine whether the first instance forum is the natural forum, or whether the forum has the closest connection with the action and the parties. The court adjudicates whether there is another forum that is more appropriate under the doctrine of comity. The current forum court must respect the right of a foreign court to assume jurisdiction. A court must balance the interests of the parties, since there is injustice not only when a plaintiff is allowed to pursue the action in a forum inconvenient to the defendant, but also when a plaintiff is not allowed a timely trial.

Generally, the court will not grant a petition to transfer or an injunction if the grant unjustly will deprive the plaintiff of advantages in the first instance forum. Nevertheless, a real and substantial connection between the venue and the cause(s) of action should exist to provide defendants some protection against being pursued in jurisdictions that have little or no connection with the transaction or the parties.

If the alternative court concludes that another court has assumed jurisdiction either without considering whether an alternative forum was available or has reached an obviously unreasonable conclusion on the merits, then an injunction would sometimes be a reasonable response. If, on the other hand, the alternative court has reasonably concluded that no more convenient forum was available, then comity requires it to respect the decision of the court that has already assumed jurisdiction and dismiss the application for an injunction and transfer. In cases where there is a sound argument to be made in favour of both courts, the court in the second venue should not arbitrarily claim a better right to decide for both jurisdictions. In most cases the adherence of the foreign court to principles resembling those applied in the second venue court will be obvious; if the foreign court has adhered, then the second venue court should refuse relief.

The term has become adopted in a wider context for the activity of repeatedly seeking a venue or willing listener for a concern, complaint or action, until one is found.

A U.S. district court judge has stated that in reality, every litigant who files a lawsuit engages in forum shopping when he chooses a place to file suit. International family lawyers work to assist their clients in that process.

Child custody 
In one case, a court expressly acknowledged that the plaintiff had chosen to move to the state in order to benefit from the liberal divorce laws in that state. The court found that was perfectly appropriate and did not justify a stay or dismissal of the case.

On the other hand, forum shopping is generally seen as particularly inappropriate when it is intended to secure a more sympathetic forum in a child custody case. Indeed, courts have found that the Hague Abduction Convention was designed to deter parents from engaging in international forum shopping in custody cases. Specifically, the Hague Convention attempts to prevent situations in which a parent dissatisfied with current custodial arrangements flees with the child to another country to re-litigate the merits of custody and to obtain a more favorable custody order.

Nonetheless, it may well be in the best interests of a child to remove the child from a forum which does not apply the best interests test in child custody cases to a forum which has a "better" law and practice in such cases.

"There is often a legal vacuum that encourages one parent to take children away from the other, and to deprive the children of access to the other parent," Morley says. "It not only hurts foreign parents if the Chinese partner takes the child to China, it also hurts Chinese parents living in China because if the other parent takes their child to a foreign country from China, the courts in that foreign country are unable to order the child's return to China under the terms of the convention."

United States 
The United States has attracted foreign litigants wishing to take advantage of the more generous awards of damages and alimony, extensive discovery rules, and the contingent fee system. In addition, the Foreign Trade Antitrust Improvements Act, the Alien Tort Claims Act, and many state product liability laws create legal rights that often do not exist in other jurisdictions.

By the plaintiff 
A plaintiff frequently can choose to file his case in one of several jurisdictions by picking a federal rather than a local jurisdiction, a local rather than federal jurisdiction, or one of several geographic localities. The defendant in a civil case can be sued in a jurisdiction where he lives or where the cause of action occurred. In the United States, the district court for the eastern district of Texas in Marshall, Texas, has become a popular forum for patent lawsuits, since it found in favor of the plaintiff 78% of the time; the national average is 59%.

By the civil defendant 
A defendant can resort to various procedures or theories to have a case removed from the court wherein the plaintiff originally filed it. The defendant may invoke the removal jurisdiction of a federal court to take a claim out of the state court, request for a change of venue because the case was brought in the improper court within the jurisdiction, and move for forum non conveniens on the ground that the case was brought in an inappropriate forum based on the locations of the parties or evidence.

In criminal cases 
Forum shopping also happens, albeit less frequently, in U.S. federal criminal trials, especially as certain districts and circuits are widely thought to favor the government in particular issues or trials. It is often claimed that the U.S. federal trials of terrorists were forum shopped.

Criminal defendants have much less power to change the forum in which the case against them has been brought. Generally, they can do so only where they can show that localized notoriety or publicity makes it unlikely that an impartial jury can be selected in the district in which charges were brought.

Efforts to discourage forum shopping 
While the plaintiff commencing the litigation is generally considered the master of his/her own complaint, courts may object to forum shopping for several reasons. The fair resolution of a case hinging on technical differences from one jurisdiction to the next would offend the sense of justice, and more practically, judges may fear that having the reputation of a forum favorable to certain types of plaintiffs will delay the timely dispensation of justice in other cases by increasing their workload.

Under the Erie doctrine, a federal court hearing a case under the diversity jurisdiction must apply the law of the state in which the court is sitting. When a case has connection to more than just a single state, the forum state's choice of law principles generally guide the selection of what place's law will apply.

Parties to a contract may seek to prevent forum shopping by inserting a forum selection clause or a choice of law clause in their contract. Such clauses are now generally enforced by the courts.

Philippines 
Forum shopping is considered a serious offense which can be made by a complainant. The law in the Philippines explicitly prohibits the filing of more than one case for the same cause of action in any forum or court of law so that the courts will not be clogged by complaints of people who may file more than one complaint in an effort to gain a favorable decision in any of the numerous cases filed.

England and Wales 

In England and Welsh law, laws on libel can be considered to be more favourable to the plaintiff than in other jurisdictions, leading to a form of forum shopping sometimes called "defamation shopping" or "libel tourism".

In The Atlantic Star [1973] QB 364 at 381–382, Lord Denning MR famously stated:

In International Relations 

In international relations (IR) theory, the term 'forum shopping' describes the situation where a state is member of two or more different international- or regional organizations which deal with the same policy area (overlapping regionalism) so the state can choose the forum (organization) for addressing a certain issue which serves its interests best. This is particular important in international trade  and in security issues.

See also 
 Asylum shopping
 Jurisdiction shopping
 "Race to the courthouse"
 Tort reform
 Libel tourism
 International child abduction

References

External links 
 Forum shopping in US Terrorism Cases and the "DC Sniper" Case
 Forum Shopping in Patent and Antitrust Cases (PDF)
 Rethinking Forum Shopping in Cyberspace by Kimberly A. Moore
 Forum Shopping in Patent Cases: Does Geographic Choice Affect Innovation?  by Kimberly A. Moore

Conflict of laws
Civil procedure
Venue (law)
Abuse of the legal system